Southern United F.C. is a Solomon Islands football club of Honiara, which plays in the Telekom S-League since 2020.

External links 
 Official site on FB

References

Football clubs in the Solomon Islands
Honiara
Association football clubs established in 2020